Huiju Temple is a Buddhist temple located on the slope of Mount Jiuhua in Qingyang County,  Anhui, China.

History
The original temple was first established as "Huiqing'an" in the Qing dynasty (1644–1911), which was the last feudal dynasty in China, the modern temple was founded in 1938 by abbot Puming and initially called "Huiju Chan Temple".

During the Second Sino-Japanese War, the Qingyang High School relocated to here and the temple was used as its campus.

After the 3rd Plenary Session of the 11th Central Committee of the Communist Party of China in 1982, the local government restored and refurbished the temple. In the following year, Huiju Temple was inscribed as a National Key Buddhist Temple in Han Chinese Area by the State Council of China.

In 1986, Wuchan was proposed as the new abbot of the temple. He supervised the reconstruction of Shanmen, Hall of Skanda, Hall of Guru, and Buddhist Texts Library.

Architecture
The complex include the following halls: Shanmen, Mahavira Hall, Hall of Four Heavenly Kings, Hall of Guanyin, Bell tower, Drum tower, Hall of Guru, Dharma Hall, Buddhist Texts Library, etc.

Mahavira Hall
The hall enshrining the Three-Life Buddha, namely Sakyamuni, Amitabha and Bhaisajyaguru. In front of Sakyamuni stand Manjushri and Samantabhadra on the left and right.

References

External links
 

Buddhist temples on Mount Jiuhua
Buildings and structures in Chizhou
Tourist attractions in Chizhou
1982 establishments in China
20th-century Buddhist temples
Religious buildings and structures completed in 1982